Hat Creek is a stream in the U.S. state of Georgia. It is a tributary to the Alapaha River.

Hat Creek was named from a pioneer incident when a man lost his hat near the stream.

References

Rivers of Georgia (U.S. state)
Rivers of Irwin County, Georgia
Rivers of Tift County, Georgia
Rivers of Turner County, Georgia